NordLink is a subsea 1,400 megawatt (MW) HVDC power cable between Norway and Germany, opened in May 2021.

The cable enables Deutsche Bahn to buy the full production from Mågeli kraftverk in Ullensvang, thereby helping the German railways to become climate-neutral by 2040.

Construction
It is estimated to cost €1.5–2 billion, which was financed in 2015 when Statnett decided to realize the project. The interconnector was installed between a new substation at Ertsmyra (near Tonstad) in Norway and Wilster substation in Schleswig-Holstein in Germany.  The connection was expected to be completed in 2020; the opening ceremony took place on 27 May 2021.

When testing in September 2020, it accidentally imported the full 1,400 MW into Norway for almost a minute, causing cascading grid effects such as a 0.5 Hz frequency change across the Nordic synchronous area.

In November 2021, amid high demand for electricity in Europe, the increased exports from Norway to continental Europe caused conflict with the grid operator of Sweden, which cut export capacity in half, causing the Norwegian operator to do the same for exports to Sweden (on which Denmark and Finland also rely).

Ownership
The Norwegian state-owned company and transmission system operator, Statnett SF, owns 50% of the project, whilst the Dutch transmission system operator TenneT TSO and the German state-owned bank KfW own the other half.  A cable between Norway and Germany is listed in the EU's projects of common interest (PCI).

Sites

See also 

Cross-Skagerrak
HVDC Norway–UK
NorGer
NorNed
Scotland-Norway interconnector

External links 

 – ABB to link Norwegian and German power grids
4c page
 Weekly exchange (Nord Pool data)

References 

Electrical interconnectors to and from the Nordic grid
Electrical interconnectors to and from the Synchronous Grid of Continental Europe
HVDC transmission lines
Electric power infrastructure in Norway
Electric power transmission systems in Germany
Electrical interconnectors in the North Sea
Germany–Norway relations